Žďár is a municipality and village in Rakovník District in the Central Bohemian Region of the Czech Republic. It has about 100 inhabitants.

Administrative parts
The village of Otěvěky is an administrative part of Žďár.

References

Villages in Rakovník District